Dali Tambo (born 1 March 1959) is a South African media personality best known as the presenter of the SABC television talk-show People of the South and as the founder of the anti-apartheid organisation Artists Against Apartheid.

Early life
Dali Tambo is the son of Oliver Tambo, former president of the African National Congress, and Adelaide Tambo.  Tambo attended Lancing College in West Sussex, United Kingdom, before going on to study at the American University and the Sorbonne in Paris, France, where he acquired a bachelor's degree in International Affairs and Political Science.

Dali Tambo is married to Rachael Tambo and they have four children; their oldest son is named after his father (OR Tambo).

Artists Against Apartheid
In 1983 Dali Tambo founded the anti-apartheid organisation Artists Against Apartheid with musician Jerry Dammers.  The organisation organised numerous anti-apartheid concerts in Europe during the 1980s. Tambo returned to South Africa in 1991 as apartheid ended.

People of the South
Tambo hosted the talk show People of the South on SABC from 1994 to 2002 and again from 2012 to 2013.

Mugabe interview
On 2 June 2013 People of the South aired an interview Tambo did with the President of Zimbabwe Robert Mugabe only two months before the 2013 Zimbabwean general election.  It reportedly took Tambo three years to organise the interview with the Mugabe family.  The interview generated some controversy and was criticised for being "sycophantic" by the Mail & Guardian newspaper, and called a "public relations exercise" for Mugabe by CapeTalk567 radio presenter Kieno Kammies. In the heated interview with Kammies on CapeTalk567 Tambo replied that "People of the South [is] not Hard Talk" and that the show's laid back non-confrontational style would be at odds with challenging Mugabe on the allegations of human rights abuses, election fraud, and the controversial land reform program that Mugabe led.

Sculpture park
Since leaving People of the South in 2013, Tambo has focused his attention on promoting the idea of a commemorative sculpture park in city of Tshwane.  The planned park will feature 400 to 500 life-size bronze statues of highly regarded anti-apartheid activists.

Statues
Through his company Koketso Growth, he obtained tenders to make statues. One such an example is The Statue of Nelson Mandela on the balcony of Cape Town City Hall. He commissioned Barry Jacksen and Xhanti Mpakama to do the work. It was unveiled on 24 July 2018.

External links 
Dali Tambo's interview with Mugabe, SABC, June 2013. (Video no longer available, copyrighted by SABC)
At home with Dali Tambo (FULL INSERT), Top Billing, SABC, 3, May 2013.

References

1961 births
Living people
South African artists
Anti-apartheid activists
South African television personalities
South African expatriates in France
South African expatriates in the United Kingdom
South African exiles